DTU Vet, part of the Technical University of Denmark, is located in the Frederiksberg district of Copenhagen, Denmark. It is situated on Bülowsvej next to University of Copenhagen's Frederiksberg Campus.

History

The Veterinary Institute traces its history back to 1908 when  the Royal Veterinary and Agricultural University’s Serum Laboratory (Den Kgl. Veterinær- og Landbohøjskoles Serumlaboratorium) was established at the initiative of professor C. O. Jensen. In 1926, the Ministry of Agriculture (Landbrugsministeriet) established the Foot-and-Mouth Research Station whose name was later changed to the National Veterinary Institute for Virus Research (Statens Veterinære Institut for Virusforskning). The name of the Royal Veterinary and Agricultural University’s Serum Laboratory was changed name to the National Veterinary Serum Laboratory (Statens Veterinære Serumlaboratorium) in 1932. National Veterinary Serum Laboratory  was expanded by PLH Arkitekter in 199-99. The 0.+++ square metre extension contained new laboratories as well as stables.

In 2002 the two institutions were merged under the name Danish Veterinary Institute (Danmarks Veterinærinstitut). In 2004 the Danish Veterinary Institute was merged with the Institute for Food Safety and Nutrition (Institut for Fødevaresikkerhed og Ernæring), which was part of Danish Veterinary and Food Administration (then Fødevaredirektoratet, now Fødevarestyrelsen). The merged institution was given the name Danish Institute for Food and Veterinary Research (DFVF) (Danmarks Fødevare- og Veterinærforskning; frp, changed to Danmarks Fødevareforskning in August 2004).  In August that same year the institution was transferred to the Ministry for Family and Consumer Affairs (Ministeriet for Familie- og Forbrugeranliggender).

On 1 January 2007, DFVF merged with Technical University of Denmark (DTU). The institute was National Veterinary Institute, the National Food Institute, and the commercial unit Dianova A/S.

Future location
DTU Vet will be based in the 40,000 square metre DTU Life Science and Bioengineering Center which is currently (2015) under construction at DTU's main campus in Lyngby. DTU Vet will share the building with DTU Aqua and DTU Food Engineering. The building is the result of an architectural competition which was won by a team consisting of  COWI, Rørbæk & Møller Arkitekter and Christensen & Co.

References

External links
 Official website

Technical University of Denmark